Piotr Piekarski may refer to:

 Piotr Piekarski (runner) (born 1964), Polish middle distance runner
 Piotr Piekarski (footballer) (born 1993), Polish footballer